Frank Grant may refer to:

 Frank Grant (baseball),  19th century African-American baseball player
 Frank Grant (American football), American football player
 Frank Grant (boxer), former British boxer
 Frank Grant (All My Children), soap opera character

See also
 Frank Grant Sawyer, American politician and governor of Nevada
 Frank Gant, a jazz drummer
 Francis Grant (disambiguation)